DEF CON (also written as DEFCON, Defcon or DC) is a hacker convention held annually in Las Vegas, Nevada. The first DEF CON took place in June 1993 and today many attendees at DEF CON include computer security professionals, journalists, lawyers, federal government employees, security researchers, students, and hackers with a general interest in software, computer architecture, hardware modification, conference badges, and anything else that can be "hacked". The event consists of several tracks of speakers about computer- and hacking-related subjects, as well as cyber-security challenges and competitions (known as hacking wargames). Contests held during the event are extremely varied and can range from creating the longest Wi-Fi connection to finding the most effective way to cool a beer in the Nevada heat.

Other contests, past and present, include lockpicking, robotics-related contests, art, slogan, coffee wars, scavenger hunt, and Capture the Flag. Capture the Flag (CTF) is perhaps the best known of these contests and is a hacking competition where teams of hackers attempt to attack and defend computers and networks using software and network structures. CTF has been emulated at other hacking conferences as well as in academic and military contexts (as red team exercises).

Federal law enforcement agents from the FBI, DoD, United States Postal Inspection Service, DHS (via CISA) and other agencies regularly attend DEF CON.

History 
DEF CON was founded in 1993, by then 18-year-old Jeff Moss as a farewell party for his friend, a fellow hacker and member of "Platinum Net", a FidoNet protocol based hacking network from Canada. The party was planned for Las Vegas a few days before his friend was to leave the United States, because his father had accepted employment out of the country. However, his friend's father left early, taking his friend along, so Jeff was left alone with the entire party planned. Jeff decided to invite all his hacker friends to go to Las Vegas with him and have the party with them instead. Hacker friends from far and wide got together and laid the foundation for DEF CON, with roughly 100 people in attendance.

The term DEF CON comes from the movie WarGames, referencing the U.S. Armed Forces defense readiness condition (DEFCON). In the movie, Las Vegas was selected as a nuclear target, and since the event was being hosted in Las Vegas, it occurred to Jeff Moss to name the convention DEF CON. However, to a lesser extent, CON also stands for convention and DEF is taken from the letters on the number 3 on a telephone keypad, a reference to phreakers. Any variation of the spelling, other than "DEF CON", could be considered an infringement of the DEF CON brand. The official name of the conference includes a space in-between DEF and CON.

Though intended to be a one-time event, Moss received overwhelmingly positive feedback from attendees, and decided to host the event for a second year at their urging. The event's attendance nearly doubled the second year, and has enjoyed continued success. In 2019, an estimated 30,000 people attended DEF CON 27.

 For DEF CON's 20th Anniversary, a film was commissioned entitled DEFCON: The Documentary. The film follows the four days of the conference, events and people (attendees and staff), and covers history and philosophy behind DEF CON's success and unique experiences.

 In January 2018, the DEF CON China Beta event was announced. The conference was held May 11–13, 2018 in Beijing, and marked DEF CON's first conference outside the United States. The second annual DEF CON China was canceled due to concerns related to COVID-19.

 In 2020, due to safety concerns over COVID-19 the DEF CON 28 in-person Las Vegas event was cancelled and replaced with DEF CON Safe Mode, a virtual event planned for the same August 6–9 dates as DC 28.

In 2021, DEF CON 29 was held on August 5-8 in-person in Las Vegas and virtually (via Twitch and Discord). In-person attendees were required wear masks in conference areas and to show proof to COVID-19 vaccination. Attendees with verified vaccine records (verified by a 3rd party) were given a wristband which was required for entry into the conference areas.

Black Badge
The Black Badge is the highest award DEF CON gives to contest winners of certain events. Capture the flag (CTF) winners sometimes earn these, as well as Hacker Jeopardy winners. The contests that are awarded Black Badges vary from year to year, and a Black Badge allows free entrance to DEF CON for life, potentially a value of thousands of dollars.

In April 2017, a DEF CON Black Badge was featured in an exhibit in the Smithsonian Institution's National Museum of American History entitled "Innovations in Defense: Artificial Intelligence and the Challenge of Cybersecurity". The badge belongs to ForAllSecure's Mayhem Cyber Reasoning System, the winner of the DARPA 2016 Cyber Grand Challenge at DEF CON 24 and the first non-human entity ever to earn a Black Badge.

Fundraising 
Since DEF CON 11, fundraisers have been conducted for the Electronic Frontier Foundation (EFF). The first fundraiser was a dunk tank and was an "official" event. The EFF now has an event named "The Summit" hosted by the Vegas 2.0 crew that is an open event and fundraiser. DEF CON 18 (2010) hosted a new fundraiser called MohawkCon.

Trivia

Badges
A notable part of DEF CON is the conference badge, which identifies attendees and ensures attendees can access conference events and activities. The DEF CON badge has historically been notable because of its changing nature, sometimes being an electronic badge (PCB), with LEDs, or sometimes being a non-electronic badge such as a vinyl record. Conference badges often contain challenges or callbacks to hacker or other technology history, such as the usage of the Konami Code in the DEF CON 24 badge, or the DEF CON 25 badge reverting to the look of the DEF CON 1 badge. DEF CON Badges do not (generally) identify attendees by name; however, the badges are used to differentiate attendees from others. One way of doing this has been to have different badges, a general conference attendee (HUMAN) badge, a Staff member (GOON), Vendor, Speaker, Press, and other badges. In addition, individuals and organizations have begun creating their own badges in what has become known as badgelife. These badges may be purchased in many cases, or earned at the conference by completing challenges or events. Some badges may give the holder access to after hours events at the conference. In 2018, the evolution of this came with what was termed "shitty addon's" or SAOs. These were miniature (usually) PCBs that connected to the official and other badges that may extend functionality or were just collected.

Workshops
Workshops are dedicated classes on various topics related to information security and related topics. Historical workshops have been held on topics such as Digital Forensics investigation, hacking IoT devices, playing with RFID, fuzzing and attacking smart devices.

Villages
Villages are dedicated spaces arranged around a specific topic. Villages may be considered mini conferences within the con, with many holding their own independent talks as well as hands-on activities such as CTFs, or labs. Some villages include Aerospace Village, Car Hacking Village, IoT Village, Recon, Biohacking, lockpicking, ham radio, and the well known Social Engineering and vote hacking villages. In 2018 the vote hacking village gained media attention due to concerns about US election systems security vulnerabilities.

Use of handles
Attendees at DEF CON and other Hacker conferences often utilize an alias or "handle" at conferences. This is in keeping with the hacker community's desire for anonymity. Some known handles include DEF CON founder Jeff Moss' handle of "Dark Tangent". A notable event at DEF CON is DEF CON 101 which starts off the con and may offer the opportunity for an individual to come up on stage and be assigned a handle by a number of members of the community.

Cons within DEF CON
DEF CON has its own cultural underground which results in individuals wanting to create their own meetups or "cons" within DEF CON. These may be actual formal meetups or may be informal. Well known cons are:
 Queercon, a meetup of LGBTQ community
 Linecon, any long line has the potential to turn into a con
 QuietCon, a meetup to hang out or talk quietly away from the hustle and bustle of the rest of the con
 Skytalks

DEF CON Groups
DEF CON Groups are worldwide, local chapters of hackers, thinkers, makers and others. DEF CON Groups were started as a splinter off of the 2600 meetup groups because of concerns over politicization. Local DEF CON groups are formed and are posted online. DEF CON Groups are usually identified by the area code of the area where they are located in the US, and by other numbers when outside of the US e.g., DC801, DC201. DEF CON Groups may seek permission to make a logo that includes the official DEF CON logo with approval.

Relationship to other hacker cons
DEF CON is considered the "world's largest" hacker con. It is also considered one of the core conferences, with organizers and attendees using it as a model for other conferences.

Notable incidents
High-profile issues which have garnered significant media attention.

Entertainment references 
 DEF CON was also portrayed in The X-Files episode "Three of a Kind" featuring an appearance by The Lone Gunmen. DEF CON was portrayed as a United States government–sponsored convention instead of a civilian convention.
 A semi-fictionalized account of DEF CON 2, "Cyber Christ Meets Lady Luck", written by Winn Schwartau, demonstrates some of the early DEF CON culture.
A trip to DEF CON for a hacker showdown figures into the plot of The Signal. Director William Eubank came to Las Vegas and screened the film at DEF CON Movie Night.
 A fictionalized version of DEF CON called "EXOCON" is the setting for the climax of Jason Bourne, the fifth film of the Bourne film series. The primary antagonist of the film, a fictionalized CIA director (played by Tommy Lee Jones), is a keynote speaker at the event, mimicking DEF CON 20's controversial keynote speaker, NSA director Keith B. Alexander.
 In the Mr. Robot Season 3 opener "eps3.0_power-saver-mode.h" Elliot and Darlene visit a qualifying tournament for the DEF CON Capture the Flag (CTF) contest. Sharp-eyed viewers will notice DEF CON's smiley-face-and-crossbones mascot Jack among the set decorations.
 Documentarian Werner Herzog included DEF CON in his 2016 film Lo and Behold, Reveries of the Connected World, a film described as a "playful yet chilling examination of our rapidly interconnecting online lives".

Venues, dates, and attendance
Each conference venue and date has been extracted from the DEF CON archives for easy reference.

See also
 Black Hat Briefings
 Chaos Communication Congress (C3)
 Electronic voting
 Hack-Tic, a quadrennial European convention
 Hackers on Planet Earth (HOPE)
 Security BSides, a community supported conference with locations across the globe
 Summercon, the first American hacker conference, organized by members of Phrack
 ToorCon, a yearly hacker conference held in San Diego, California since 1999

References

Further reading 
 "DefCon's Moss: Undercover Reporter Damages 'Neutral Zone'." Information Week. August 6, 2007.
 Mills, Elinor. "NSA director finally greets Defcon hackers." CNET. July 27, 2012.
 Newman, Lily Hay "To Fix Voting Machines, Hackers Tear Them Apart" WIRED August 1, 2017.

External links

DEF CON
 
 Official FAQ
 DEF CON Groups
 DEF CON v3 Tor .onion addresses

Multimedia
 DEF CON: The Documentary 
 DEF CON: The Documentary on IMDb
 A first ever look inside the DEF CON NOC (2008)
 The Story of DEF CON – video interview with Jeff Moss, a.k.a. Dark Tangent, the founder of DEF CON
 Transcript, audio, video of Jess Moss describing DEF CON's inception

Las Vegas Valley conventions and trade shows
Annual events in Nevada
Hacker conventions
Recurring events established in 1993
1993 establishments in Nevada